Huntsville High School may refer to:

Active
Huntsville High School (Alabama), in Huntsville, Alabama, United States
Huntsville High School (Arkansas), in Huntsville, Arkansas, United States
Huntsville High School (Ontario), in Huntsville, Ontario, Canada
Huntsville High School (Texas), in Huntsville, Texas, United States

Former
Huntsville High School (Tennessee), formerly on the National Register of Historic Places listings in Tennessee